The Chronicle is a weekly newspaper serving the Southern Willamette Valley in Lane County, Oregon, United States. Its area of coverage includes Springfield, Creswell, Cottage Grove and Pleasant Hill.

Formerly The Creswell Chronicle, which was established in 1909, it is the oldest locally owned newspaper in the area. The name changed to The Chronicle on Aug. 29, 2019 when it expanded its coverage area. Its newsroom and advertising headquarters is located in Springfield.

On March 1, 2019, the paper came under the ownership of Noel Nash and his wife, Denise, under Nash Publishing Group. Former newspaper publishers have included SJ Olson Publications,  Hollyer, Sittser and Hunt, and Hakes.

In 2020, The Chronicle earned 18 awards from the Oregon Newspaper Publishers Association for its news coverage, advertising and design. In 2019, the paper earned 8 awards from the same association.

References

External links 
http://www.usnpl.com/addr/aaddressresult.php?id=6649
http://www.orenews.com/creswell

Lane County, Oregon
Newspapers published in Oregon
Publications established in 1909
Oregon Newspaper Publishers Association
Weekly newspapers published in the United States